Allama Banuri Town is a residential and commercial area in Karachi, originally named "New Town". It was renamed Allama Banuri town in honour of the hadith scholar Muhammad Yousuf Banuri.

Banuri had established a religious institute by the name of Jamia Uloom ul Islamia, a world-known Deobandi madrassa.

References

Neighbourhoods of Karachi